Luis Mendez (12 December 1990  – 23 July 2013) was a Belizean footballer who played as a defender. He last played for Hankook Verdes in the Belize Premier Football League and the Belize national football team. He died in a road accident in 2013.

Club career

Hankook Verdes
In 2010, he signed for Belize Premier Football League club Hankook Verdes.

International career
He started his international career with Belize national football team in 2011.

References

1990 births
2013 deaths
Belizean footballers
Belize international footballers
Association football defenders
2011 Copa Centroamericana players
Verdes FC players
Road incident deaths in Guatemala
People from Benque Viejo del Carmen